Misconsumption also called misuse is consumption that brings harmful results rather than benefits - or that brings more harm than benefits. Products commonly cited as misconsumption include alcohol, cigarettes, and high calorie foods.

Health 
MIsconsumption can damage human health, by increasing the rates of chronic diseases such as diabetes, cancer, and heart disease. These diseases account for as much as 85 % of healthcare costs. People who are overweight, or underweight are more likely to undergo problems. 

In addition to increasing cancer rates, side-effects of alcohol consumption include road accidents, domestic violence and lost productivity.

Environment

Over-fishing 
Consumption of marine fish and seafood can drive over-fishing and other poor fishing practices that damage marine environments and deplete fisheries.

Travel 
Overuse of  vehicles, and discretionary travel by air and ship generate air pollution, which harms human health and contributes to climate change.

Policy 
The European Union estimated that its Common Agricultural Policy resulted in a deadweight loss 13% as of 2008. This resulted from misallocation of resources that transferred benefits from consumers to produces, but with a reduction in total benefits.

Responses 
Responses to avoid the costs include: 

 Prohibition (as for drugs or alcohol)
 Prevention (such as Nutriscore)
 Discouraging use or encouraging alternatives (virtuous goods)
 Regulation 
 Phase-outs. (such as for older vehicles that do not meet subsequent standards)
 Taxes and fees (sometimes referred to as "sin taxes")
 Favoring or encouraging conservation

See also 
 Prohibition

References 

Consumption